The Garrick Theatre was a 910-seat theatre built in 1890 and located on 67 West 35th Street, New York. Designed by Francis Hatch Kimball, it was commissioned by Edward Harrigan, who also managed the theatre, originally named Harrigan's Theatre, until 1895. Richard Mansfield took over from Harrigan, renaming it the Garrick. Charles Frohman assumed management from 1896 until 1915. The Shuberts bought it in 1916 and leased it to Otto Kahn, who named it Théâtre du Vieux-Colombier, after a theatre in Paris of the same name. Kahn later gave it to the Theatre Guild and it resumed the name Garrick Theatre in 1919. The Shuberts resumed management in 1925 and the theatre closed as a playhouse in 1929. After a short run of burlesque, the building was demolished in 1932.

Notable productions
 Sherlock Holmes (1899)
 Captain Jinks of the Horse Marines (1901)
 Jane Clegg (1920)
 Enter Madame (1920)
 Mr. Pim Passes By (1921) and (1927) revival
 Liliom (1921)
 He Who Gets Slapped (1922)
 R.U.R. (1922)
 Peer Gynt (1923)
 The Adding Machine (1923)
 Saint Joan (1923)
 Fata Morgana (1924)
 They Knew What They Wanted (1924)
 Processional (1925)
 Garrick Gaieties (1925)
 The Mystery Ship (1927)
 The Taming of the Shrew (1927)

References

Garrick Theatre at the Internet Broadway Database

External links
Garrick Theatre at the Internet Broadway Database
Museum of the City of New York - photos of Garrick Theatre productions and building

Theatres completed in 1890
Former Broadway theatres
Cinemas and movie theaters in Manhattan
Former theatres in Manhattan
Demolished theatres in New York City
Demolished buildings and structures in Manhattan